Deen J. Castronovo (born August 17, 1964) is an American drummer, singer, and songwriter best known for being a member of classic rock band Journey and hard rock acts Bad English and Hardline. He currently plays drums and shares lead vocals for the bands Journey, Generation Radio, and Revolution Saints. He has been a touring and studio player for Ozzy Osbourne, Steve Vai, Paul Rodgers, and Black Sabbath bassist Geezer Butler's GZR.

Early life
Deen Castronovo was born in the city of Westminster, California and started drumming at the age of 6. He grew up in Keizer, Oregon., where he attended South Salem High School. Castronovo said time in band during high school gave him identity and confidence. Deen cites Steve Smith, Neil Peart, Terry Bozzio, Peter Criss, John Bonham, Kiss, Rush, Van Halen, Led Zeppelin and AC/DC as musical influences.

Career
Castronovo is the former drummer for bands Wild Dogs, Bad English, Hardline, Ozzy Osbourne, and GZR. He currently plays drums and shares lead vocals for the bands Revolution Saints and Journey.

Wild Dogs (1982–1987)
Wild Dogs is an America rock band from Portland, Oregon formed loosely in 1981 by Jeff Mark, Danny Kurth, Matt McCourt, and Pete Holmes. Drummer Pete Holmes was lured away by Black 'n Blue and was replaced by Jaime St. James. The band had an appearance on a compilation series, but before a full album could be recorded with Shrapnel Records, St. James left the band to also join Black 'n Blue. It was at this point Deen was first discovered by McCourt, who recruited the local, and then only 17-year-old drummer Castronovo to join the band.

Castronovo played on the self-titled debut album Wild Dogs (1983), the followup Man's Best Friend (1984) and Reign Of Terror (1987). The band was known for its live show that featured McCourt's props and Castronovo's showmanship.

Bad English (1987–1991)
While working with Wild Dogs, Castronovo met and began working with Tony MacAlpine, which led to an introduction to future long-time collaboration partner, Neal Schon. Shortly after, Neal would invite Castronovo to audition for a new band with Jonathan Cain, John Waite and Ricky Phillips, which became Bad English. After two albums, which included being nominated for Best New Group in 1989 at the International Rock Awards, Bad English disbanded in 1991. In 1995 a Greatest Hits was released.

Hardline (1991–1992)
Again working with Neal Schon, Castronovo played drums and sang backing vocals on Hardline's debut album Double Eclipse. The album's first single "Takin' Me Down" peaked at No. 37 on Billboard Hot Mainstream Rock Tracks chart. The album's second single, a cover of the Danny Spanos song "Hot Cherie," rose to No. 25 on the Hot Mainstream Rock Tracks chart.

Ozzy Osbourne (1995)
Castronovo appeared on the 1995 release Ozzmosis, the seventh solo studio album by Ozzy Osbourne. The album reached number 22 on the UK Albums Chart and number four on the US Billboard 200. Castronovo also toured with Ozzy on a portion of the 1995 leg of the Retirement Sucks Tour.

Journey (1998–2015, 2021–present)
 Castronovo continued to be in various bands along with Schon, from Hardline to Paul Rodgers. After a 3-year stint with Vasco Rossi, he joined Journey, where he would spend the next 18 years and 5 albums as the drummer, backing and occasional lead vocalist.

While not the original drummer for Journey, Castronovo is the longest-serving drummer to date, having played on the albums Arrival (2001), Red 13 (2002), Generations (2005),  Revelation (2008), Eclipse (2011) and Freedom (2022).

As a vocalist, he sang "Still They Ride", "Mother, Father" and "Keep On Runnin'" (and on rare occasions, "Faithfully" and "Where Were You") in concert in order to let the main lead vocalists take a break. In the studio, he performed lead vocals on "A Better Life" and "Never Too Late" on Generations, as well as "After Glow" on Freedom.

Castronovo was fired by Journey in August 2015 following a June 2015 domestic violence arrest. He was replaced by Omar Hakim on the band's 2015 tour, with longtime drummer Steve Smith subsequently rejoining the band.

In July 2021, Schon confirmed Castronovo's return to Journey as a second drummer alongside Narada Michael Walden. Following Walden's departure from the group in 2022, he became the sole drummer once again, though they both still appear on Freedom.

Soul SirkUS (2004–2005)
After the Planet Us project did not produce an album, Neal Schon was determined to see the material he had written come to life. At the 2004 annual NAMM Show in Los Angeles, Schon met up with Jeff Scott Soto and tested the waters with a jam session. While in Los Angeles, Schon also attended a showcase featuring Marco Mendoza. Inviting Soto, Mendoza and Castronovo to join him, the new band, Soul SirkUS, began rehearsing and eventually recorded 11 songs for their debut album, World Play. Although all the foundation tracks on the album were originally written for Planet Us, only one completed song from that band was used for Soul SirkUS debut.

In early 2005, with a completed album titled World Play (the "black sleeve" version) the band was ready to tour, but Castronovo fell ill due to extreme exhaustion. Soon after, Castronovo bowed out of Soul SirkUS based on his doctor's recommendation and was replaced by Australian drummer Virgil Donati.

Ultimate there were 3 editions of the album. The Black Sleeve version was the original with Castronovo drumming, the Green Sleeve version was an American edition remastered, the Yellow Sleeve had two versions: a European edition of remaster that included a bonus DVD, and a Japanese edition of the remaster included a bonus track. The Black Sleeve version is the only one with Castronovo.

Revolution Saints (2014–present)
While still with Journey, Castronovo, Jack Blades (Night Ranger, Damn Yankees and Shaw Blades), and Doug Aldrich (Whitesnake, Dio, The Dead Daisies) formed Revolution Saints. The band, where Deen served as lead vocalist and handled drumming duties, released its self-titled debut album on February 24, 2015. A follow-up album, Light in the Dark, was released on October 13, 2017. The album was ranked #8 on Dr. Music's 2017 "Album of the Year" list.

Gioeli-Castronovo (2017–present)
Johnny Gioeli and Castronovo first played together on the debut Hardline album, Double Eclipse, which was released in 1992. 25 years later, the two were reunited in Italy to commence work on the debut Gioeli-Castronovo album, Set The World On Fire, available July 13, 2018. Both men have continued on their musical paths since they last saw one another, with Gioeli continuing to lead Hardline as well as being the lead singer of Crush 40 and Axel Rudi Pell's band, while Castronovo spent time with various bands.

Generation Radio (2020–2021)
In 2020, Castronovo joined the supergroup, Generation Radio. He played drums and shared lead vocals with Jay DeMarcus (Keyboards), Jason Scheff (Bass), Chris Rodriguez (Guitar), and Tom Yankton (Guitar). The band performed their first live concert on October 28, 2020, in Nashville, TN. All proceeds from the concert benefited the ACM Lifting Lives COVID Relief Fund. The group released its debut album on August 12, 2022. He left Generation Radio to rejoin Journey and was replaced on drums by Steve Ferrone

Other projects
Castronovo's first big gig came at the age of 16 with a band called The Enemy, who opened up for bands like Blue Öyster Cult and Foghat. He has played in Cacophony, Dr. Mastermind, Planet Us (a short-lived supergroup with Sammy Hagar, Michael Anthony, Joe Satriani and Neal Schon), Social Distortion, and GZR (formed by Black Sabbath bassist Geezer Butler), as well as in backing bands for Vasco Rossi, Paul Rodgers, and Matthew Ward.

He also played on the song "Smoke of the Revolution" on the Neal Schon solo album Late Nite (1989).

After working with Paul Rodgers, he began doing session work with Steve Vai, with whom he made two albums. Steve later called for him to audition for Ozzy Osbourne, which resulted in him recording Ozzmosis and doing a South American Tour with Ozzy. After Ozzy, he began doing session work for producer Michael Beinhorn, recording with Social Distortion, Geezer Butler's solo project and Hole.

He has released an instructional video entitled "High Performance Drumming" in 1991, and has been involved with the Boys & Girls Club of Salem.

In 2019, he toured with guitarist Neal Schon on the "Journey Through Time" tour, which features former members of Journey performing songs from the band's entire discography (including some no longer performed by the official Journey). He acted as the drummer and shares lead vocal duties with keyboardist Gregg Rolie.

Personal life

Castronovo was arrested on June 14, 2015 and charged with fourth-degree assault and menacing after police say he physically injured a woman. As a result, he was dropped immediately from upcoming Journey performances and ultimately replaced by Omar Hakim on the band's 2015 tour.  On June 29, 2015, Castronovo was indicted by a Marion County grand jury on felony charges of rape, assault, sexual abuse, unlawful use of a dangerous weapon, and contempt of court (violation of terms of bail after the June 14 arrest). In a plea bargain, Castronovo pleaded guilty to five domestic violence misdemeanor charges and received a suspended sentence of four years of probation.

Discography

References

External links
Official Deen Castronovo Website 

Interview with Deen Castronovo July 30, 2011 UnRated Magazine
REVOLUTION SAINTS Feat. DEEN CASTRONOVO, DOUG ALDRICH, JACK BLADES: 'Freedom' Video August 18, 2017 BLABBERMOUTH.NET
Deen Castronovo The Dead Daisies
Former Journey Drummer Deen Castronovo Gets Back To Music: Exclusive Interview December 15, 2017 Ultimate Classic Rock
Deen Castronovo on 'Freedom' and Revolution Saints! December 9, 2017 Music Matters Magazine
Journey's drummer Deen Castronovo helps re-build Oregon school CBSNews.com
Neal Schon Delivers "Journey Through Time" iHeartRADIO
Neal Schon Goes Deep Into His Past at Solo Benefit Show Ultimate Classic Rock
 Indie Pulse Music

1964 births
Living people
American heavy metal drummers
Journey (band) members
Soul SirkUS members
Bad English members
Hardline (band) members
The Ozzy Osbourne Band members
Planet Us members
Musicians from California
Musicians from Oregon
People from Keizer, Oregon
People from Westminster, California
20th-century American drummers
American male drummers
GZR members
Cacophony (band) members
The Dead Daisies members
Revolution Saints members